Claytonia virginica, the Virginia springbeauty, eastern spring beauty, grass-flower or fairy spud, is an herbaceous perennial plant in the family Montiaceae. Its native range is eastern North America. Its scientific name honors Colonial Virginian botanist John Clayton (1694–1773).

Description
Springbeauty is a perennial plant, overwintering through a tuberous root.

It has a raceme inflorescence, in which its flowers branch off of the shoot. The individual flowers bloom for three days, although the five stamens on each flower are only active for a single day. Flowering occurs between March and May depending on part of its range and weather. The seeds are released from the capsule fruit when it breaks open. Elaiosomes are present on the seeds and allow for ant dispersal.

Claytonia virginiaca is a cytologically complex taxon, including diploids with n=6, 7, 8 and 9, and tetraploids, hexaploids, octaploids and dodecaploids. The largest number of chromosomes (2n=ca. 191) was observed in the New York area.

Habitat and range
Springbeauty is found in the Eastern temperate deciduous forest of North America. It is noted for its abundance throughout many parts of its range, especially in forests. The plant can be found throughout many different habitat types including lawns, city parks, forests, roadsides, wetlands, bluffs, and ravines.

Hammond's yellow spring beauty
Hammond's yellow spring beauty, Claytonia virginica var. hammondiae, is a varietal with a very small range and population in a few areas of Northwestern New Jersey.

Uses
This plant has been used medicinally by the Iroquois, who would give a cold infusion or decoction of the powdered roots to children suffering from convulsions. They would also eat the raw roots, believing that they permanently prevented conception. They would also eat the roots as food, as would the Algonquin people, who cooked them like potatoes.

Spring beauty corms along with the entire above ground portion of the plant are safe for human consumption. The leaves can be cooked in salted water, although are not choice eating.

References

Bibliography

External links

Virginia Native Plant Society: Claytonia virginica
Connecticut Botanical Society: Claytonia virginica 

virginica
Flora of the Eastern United States
Flora of Eastern Canada
Plants used in traditional Native American medicine
Plants used in Native American cuisine
Ephemeral plants
Plants described in 1753
Taxa named by Carl Linnaeus